Pseudostellaria jamesiana is a species of flowering plant in the family Caryophyllaceae known by the common names tuber starwort and sticky starwort. It is native to much of the western United States, where it can be found in sagebrush, coniferous forests, and many other types of habitat. It is a perennial herb growing from a rhizome network with tuberlike swellings. The stem grows up to 45 to 60 centimeters in maximum height. It is four-angled and usually at least partially coated in glandular hairs. The thick lance-shaped leaves are up to 15 centimeters long, oppositely arranged, and sometimes rough and hairy. The inflorescence is a cluster of flowers at the tip of the stem or in the leaf axils. Flowers occurring in leaf axils are sometimes cleistogamous, never opening. Open flowers have five white petals with two lobes at the tips and usually ten long stamens.

External links
Jepson Manual Treatment
USDA Plants Profile
Flora of North America
Washington Burke Museum
Photo gallery

jamesiana